Luiza dos Santos Valdetaro (born September 7, 1985) is a Brazilian actress and businesswoman. She has lived in London since 2015, where she became a partner of the multinational producer BlueMoon and began to dedicate her career to entrepreneurship.

Career
In 2002 she appeared in the first chapters of the 2002 season of Malhação as a student attending the club,  until making debut in a fixed novel, with the personage Gabi, in Celebridade. After this, she participated in the novel América, interpreting Manu. In 2006, she lived her first protagonist of the teen soap opera Malhação. Also interpreted Gloria, in Viver a Vida of Manoel Carlos. In 2011 she was in the telenovela Cordel Encantado as Antônia, one of the protagonists of the plot.

In 2012 she played Gerusa Bastos, one of the protagonists of the remake of Gabriela, work of Jorge Amado adapted by Walcyr Carrasco and direction of Mauro Mendonça Filho.

Between 2013 and 2014 she joined the cast of the novel Joia Rara, as Hilda, an aspiring singer.

Filmography

Television

Film

References

External links

1985 births
Living people
Actresses from Rio de Janeiro (city)
Brazilian film actresses
Brazilian television actresses
21st-century Brazilian businesswomen
21st-century Brazilian businesspeople
Brazilian emigrants to England